Joseph Agyriba (born 13 February 1989) is a French professional footballer who plays  as a midfielder for Championnat National 3 club Racing Colombes 92.

Career
Born in Accra, Ghana, Agyriba came through the youth system at Red Star. He has played in Italy with Benevento and has played in Greece for AEK Athens, Diagoras and Glyfada.
On 28 January 2014, Agyriba signed a contract with Tercera División club CF Torre Levante.
In June 2014 Agyriba signed a contract with Championnat National club Red Star.

On 20 February 2016, Agyriba scores his first goal with UJA Maccabi Paris Métropole against US Sénart-Moissy.
In August 2017 Agyriba renewed his contract with Championnat National 3 club Racing Colombes 92.

References

External links
 
 

1989 births
Living people
Footballers from Accra
Association football midfielders
French footballers
Ghanaian emigrants to France
French expatriate footballers
French expatriate sportspeople in Greece
French expatriate sportspeople in Spain
Expatriate footballers in Greece
Expatriate footballers in Spain
AEK Athens F.C. players
Diagoras F.C. players
A.O. Glyfada players
Red Star F.C. players
UJA Maccabi Paris Métropole players
Racing Club de France Football players
Championnat National players
CF Torre Levante players